Sogorki is the name of several rural localities in Kharovsky District of Vologda Oblast, Russia:
Sogorki, Kharovsky Selsoviet, Kharovsky District, Vologda Oblast, a selo in Kharovsky Selsoviet
Sogorki, Semigorodny Selsoviet, Kharovsky District, Vologda Oblast, a settlement in Semigorodny Selsoviet